Varibaculum cambriense is a Gram-positive and anaerobic bacterium from the genus of Varibaculum which has been isolated from a human postauricular abscess.

References

Actinomycetales
Bacteria described in 2003